The Dingjiazha Tomb No. 5 is a mural tomb of the Northern Liang kingdom when the Sixteen Kingdoms came to an end and the Northern Wei Dynasty was beginning, c. 384–441. The tomb was excavated in 1977 and has elements of art found in works from Eastern Han dynasty, Northern Wei dynasty, Jin dynasty, as well as the Mogao Caves. It is located in Jiuquan, Gansu Province, China.

The tomb is divided into two rooms, with murals covering the walls and ceilings of the entry room, creating a multi-level display of the lord's place in the world, between sky above and his workers below. The paintings are done in a mythic style; painted into the peak of the ceiling, overlooking everything (with the whole world and celestial realm beneath it) is a lotus. It is above celestial images of the heavens on the ceiling (nine-tail fox, flying horse, flying human or apsara), which are above the lord and his household in the center (the lord sitting with his servants on one side, those serving him behind him, performers dancing and playing instruments before him), who are above those who work and till the land below.

The image of the musicians and dancers is known as the Music and Bai Opera (乐伎和百戏图 Lè jì hé bǎi xì tú), part of the overall picture of the lord and his domain, known as Leisurely life, travel, and music. It features musicians playing waist drum, flute, lute, and guqin. The lute shown here was relatively new to China, or in the process of entering China, and is one of the earliest lute images in China.

Gallery

References

Notes
The names change when using electronic translators. The following explain areas not explained well by translators:

 Zhu, Fengsh paper referred to a Post-Six period, which was the Later Liang (Sixteen Kingdoms), from 386 AD ~ AD 403
 Zhu, Fengsh paper referred to a North Cool period which was the Northern Liang, from (397-439)
 Zhu, Fengsh paper referred to the waist drum as a "Western musical instrument" and talked of the conquest of Kucha as being useful in dating the tomb. Kucha was a non-Chinese land to the West of the Chinese, whose music would come to influence China. It was conquered by Lü Guang in 384 A.D.

Tombs in China
Archaeological sites in China
Jiuquan
Northern Liang
1977 archaeological discoveries